In the Turkish classification system for railway locomotives, the number of powered axles are followed by the total number of axles. It is identical to the Swiss system except that the latter places a slash between the two numbers.

Thus

0-6-0 becomes 33

4-6-2 becomes 36

2-6-4 becomes 36

2-8-0 becomes 45

See also 

 UIC classification system

Locomotive classification systems
Locomotives of Turkey